Perry Lynn "Wheels" Anderson (born October 14, 1961) is a Canadian retired professional ice hockey forward who played for the St. Louis Blues, New Jersey Devils and San Jose Sharks of the NHL. Anderson was drafted by the St. Louis Blues with the 117th overall pick in the 1980 NHL Entry Draft.

Career

Junior hockey
Born in Barrie, Ontario, Anderson played with the Alliston Hornets of the OHA-C in the 1977–78 season, earning 60 points in 45 games, as he was drafted by the Kingston Canadians of the OMJHL.

He joined the Canadians as a 17-year-old in the 1978-79 season, where as a rookie, Anderson had 19 points in 61 games, followed by three points in five playoff games. Anderson improved his numbers in the 1979–80 season, as he scored 17 goals and 33 points in 63 games with Kingston. He was held pointless in three playoff games.

Anderson began the 1980–81 season with Kingston, earning 22 points in 38 games, along with 118 PIM, before being traded to the Brantford Alexanders. In 31 games with Brantford, Anderson had 35 points. In the playoffs, Anderson had four goals and six points in six games.

Professional career

St. Louis Blues
Anderson was drafted by the St. Louis Blues in the sixth round, 117th overall, in the 1980 NHL Entry Draft. The Blues had Anderson begin the 1981–82 season with the Salt Lake Golden Eagles of the CHL, where he recorded 32 goals and 64 points in 72 games, as well as 117 PIM. Anderson appeared in two playoff games with the Golden Eagles, scoring a goal. Anderson also had his first taste of the NHL in 1981–82, as he appeared in five games with the Blues, scoring a goal and two assists. Anderson then suited up for ten playoff games with St. Louis, scoring two goals.

Anderson spent the majority of the 1982–83 season with Salt Lake, earning 42 points in 57 games, along with 140 PIM, however, he was once again called up to St. Louis, where in 18 games, Anderson had five goals and seven points.

In the 1983–84 season, Anderson played in eight games with the Montana Magic of the CHL, where he had 10 points in eight games. He spent most of the season with St. Louis, where Anderson played in 50 games, earning 12 points, while accumulating 195 PIM. He was held pointless in nine playoff games, as he had 27 PIM.

Anderson spent the entire 1984–85 season with the Blues, earning 18 points in a career high 71 games. He appeared in three playoff games, as he was held pointless.

On August 29, 1985, the Blues traded Anderson to the New Jersey Devils for Rick Meagher and the Devils twelfth round draft pick in the 1986 NHL Entry Draft.

New Jersey Devils
Anderson would score a career high 19 points with the Devils in the 1985–86 season in 51 games, as he had seven goals and twelve assists, however, the Devils did not advance to the playoffs.

He would match his career high 19 points in 1986–87, as he had a career best ten goals for New Jersey in 57 games. The Devils would once again fail to make the playoffs. Anderson also had a stint with the Maine Mariners of the AHL, earning nine points in nine games.

In 1987–88, Anderson saw his production drop, as he had only ten points in 60 games, his lowest point total since the 1982-83 season. Anderson also saw his penalty minutes jump, as he had a career high 222. In the playoffs, Anderson had no points in ten games, while recording a Devils playoff record 113 penalty minutes.

He ran into some injury problems in the 1988–89 season, as Anderson dressed for only 39 games with New Jersey, earning nine points, as well as 128 PIM.

Anderson spent the entire 1989–90 season with the Utica Devils of the AHL, where he scored 13 goals and 30 points in 71 games. Most of the 1990-91 season was spent in Utica once again, as Anderson had 19 goals and 33 points in 68 games, as well as 245 PIM. Anderson did spend a part of the season in New Jersey, where he appeared in only one regular season game, going pointless, before earning an assist in four playoff games with the Devils.

On July 8, 1991, Anderson left the Devils as a free agent, as he signed with the San Jose Sharks.

San Jose Sharks
Anderson once again had a regular spot in the NHL, as he appeared in 48 games with the expansion team San Jose Sharks, earning 12 points while posting 143 PIM. It would be Anderson's only season in San Jose.

Minor leagues
Anderson signed with the San Diego Gulls of the IHL for the 1992–93 season, where he had 21 points in 51 games before going pointless in five playoff games.

Anderson finished his career with the Salt Lake Golden Eagles of the IHL in 1993–94, where he appeared in only two games, going pointless, while having 21 PIM. He retired from hockey following the season.

Career statistics

Regular season and playoffs

See also 
 Currently works for Krasiva Windows & Doors https://krasivawindows.com/
List of St. Louis Blues players
 List of New Jersey Devils players
 List of San Jose Sharks players

References

External links

1961 births
Living people
Brantford Alexanders players
Canadian ice hockey left wingers
Canadian people of Scottish descent
Kingston Canadians players
Maine Mariners players
Montana Magic players
New Jersey Devils players
St. Louis Blues draft picks
St. Louis Blues players
Salt Lake Golden Eagles (CHL) players
Salt Lake Golden Eagles (IHL) players
San Jose Sharks players
Utica Devils players
Sportspeople from Barrie
Ice hockey people from Simcoe County
Canadian expatriate ice hockey players in the United States